The Greenwood Tunnel is a historic railroad tunnel constructed in 1853 by Claudius Crozet during the construction of the Blue Ridge Railroad.  The tunnel was the easternmost tunnel in a series of four tunnels used to cross the Blue Ridge Mountains of Virginia.  Located near Greenwood in Albemarle County, Virginia, the tunnel was used by the Chesapeake and Ohio Railway (C&O) until its abandonment in 1944.  The tunnel still exists, though sealed, next to the old C&O line, now owned by CSX Transportation and leased to the Buckingham Branch Railroad, which runs through a cut bypassing the old tunnel.

History
On March 5, 1849, the Virginia General Assembly passed an act to incorporate the Blue Ridge Railroad.  This railroad was incorporated to construct a rail line over the Blue Ridge Mountains for the Louisa railroad (renamed as the Virginia Central Railroad in February, 1850) from a point near Blair Park at the eastern base of the mountains to Waynesboro in the Shenandoah Valley via Rockfish Gap.  Claudius Crozet was appointed as chief engineer of the Blue Ridge Railroad and developed a plan to cross the mountains using a series of four tunnels.  The Greenwood Tunnel was the first tunnel on the eastern approach to the mountains, driven through a small ridge near the village of Greenwood.

During the construction of the tunnel, the earth encountered was composed of clays and rotten slate, which created difficulties in maintaining a solid structure and was described by Crozet as "of most unfavorable character for tunneling."  Because of this, it was found necessary to line the entire length of the tunnel with a strong arch made of bricks.  This arching procedure was hindered, however, by the poor quality of the bricks provided by Joseph Dettor, a local brickmaker.  The bricks provided by Dettor were also planned to be used in the next tunnel west of the Greenwood Tunnel, Brookville Tunnel, but the conditions at Brookville were found to necessitate the use of a much stronger and more reliable brick, as the rock and earth was weaker.  Because of their low quality, Crozet decided to not use Dettor's bricks in the Brookville Tunnel, but only in the Greenwood Tunnel, where the earth was slightly stronger.  The best of the available bricks were chosen to be used in the tunnel, but problems with the quality of the brick still arose later on, when it was found that during freezing and thawing conditions, the arch was weakened by water.  Nevertheless, the Greenwood Tunnel was completed and put into use by 1853, with a total cost of construction of $74,400.  Although the construction of the Greenwood Tunnel was, as Crozet states, "excessively dangerous," the work was completed without accident.

Although the tunnel was abandoned, it was left in place beside the new cut and was sealed with concrete, in which state it remains to the present day.

See also
List of tunnels documented by the Historic American Engineering Record in Virginia

Footnotes

References

Buildings and structures in Albemarle County, Virginia
Railroad tunnels in Virginia
Chesapeake and Ohio Railway tunnels
Tunnels completed in 1853
Historic American Engineering Record in Virginia